Salih Omurtak (1889–23 June 1954) was a Turkish general and the fourth Chief of the General Staff of the Turkish Armed Forces.

Biography

He was born 1889 in Thessaloniki, in the Salonica Vilayet of the Ottoman Empire (present-day Greece). He graduated from the Military College in 1907 with the rank of a lieutenant. After finishing the Staff College in 1910, he became a staff officer and served at several headquarters in the Ottoman Army.

Deployed to Ankara on 22 January 1920, he joined the Turkish revolutionaries and commanded various troops during and after the Turkish War of Independence, including the 61st Division. He was promoted to the rank of the Mirliva in 1926, and in 1930, he became a Ferik. From 1940 on, Omurtak held the commander-in-chief post of the First Army in the rank of the Orgeneral (four-star general).

He was appointed Chief of the General Staff of the Turkish Armed Forces on 1 August 1946 following the resignation of Kazım Orbay, and served at this position until 8 June 1949. His following duty was the membership in the Military High Advisory Board, which he held until his retirement on 6 July 1950.

Salih Omurtak died on 23 June 1954 in Ankara. His body was moved later to a permanent burial place in the Turkish State Cemetery.

See also
List of high-ranking commanders of the Turkish War of Independence

References

External links

 Salih OMURTAK in the official website of the Turkish General Staff 

1889 births
1954 deaths
Military personnel from Thessaloniki
People from Salonica vilayet
Macedonian Turks
Ottoman Army officers
Turkish Army generals
Commanders of the First Army of Turkey
Deputy Chiefs of the Turkish General Staff
Chiefs of the Turkish General Staff
Ottoman military personnel of World War I
Turkish military personnel of the Greco-Turkish War (1919–1922)
Ottoman Military Academy alumni
Ottoman Military College alumni
Recipients of the Medal of Independence with Red Ribbon (Turkey)
Burials at Turkish State Cemetery